Brisbane, the capital city of the Australian state of Queensland, has a network of suburban railways that carry commuters, long-distance passengers, and freight. Suburban and interurban passenger services in Brisbane and South East Queensland are operated by the Queensland Rail City network, a branch of Queensland Rail, which operates long-distance trains across the state. Aurizon and Pacific National operate freight services.

History

Construction

The first railway in Queensland did not actually run to Brisbane, but ran from Ipswich to Grandchester. Opened in July 1865, the line into Brisbane was not completed until the opening of the Albert Bridge in July 1875. Branch lines in the city itself did not start until the next decade, with the branch line to Sandgate opened in May 1882, and the branch from Eagle Junction to Racecourse in September the same year.

Lines were opened from Brisbane to Sandgate and Ascot in 1882. The first section of the North Coast line opened to Petrie in 1888. In 1891 this line was connected to the Maryborough line at Gympie, creating a through line to Mount Perry. A branch line was built from Caboolture to Woodford in 1909 and Kilcoy in 1913, now closed. A branch line was opened from Monkland (south of Gympie) to Brooloo in 1915. A line was opened from the first South Brisbane station at Stanley Street, Woolloongabba to Beenleigh in 1885, and extended to Southport in 1889 and Tweed Heads, New South Wales in 1903. This line was closed beyond Beenleigh in 1964.

A branch line was completed between Park Road station and Cleveland in 1889, although the section beyond Lota station was closed and since reconstructed. A new South Brisbane station was built on Melbourne Street in 1891. This became the terminus of the standard gauge line from Grafton in 1930 and Sydney in 1932.  A dual gauge line was built from South Brisbane over the Brisbane River to Roma Street in 1978. A line was opened in 1980 from a junction near Lindum station on the Cleveland line to the Port of Brisbane at Fisherman's Island. This was converted to dual 1435/1067 mm gauge and extended in parallel with the duplicated passenger line to Dutton Park in about 1995 under the Keating Government's One Nation program.

The Beaudesert line was opened between Bethania and Beaudesert in 1888, and closed in 1996. The Canungra line was completed to Canungra in 1915, now closed. The line from extended from Roma Street to Central stations in 1889, and to Brunswick Street station in 1890. The Ferny Grove line was opened from a junction at Mayne to Enoggera in 1899. The short Laidley Valley railway lines opened on 19 April 1911 but was never profitable.

Electrification

Duplication

To increase the capacity on a number of lines, the rail network in Brisbane has required some tracks to be duplicated. In June 2004, Queensland Government announced rail duplication of the Gold Coast line between Ormeau and Coomera stations. Between 2008 and 2010, work was carried out to duplicate the tracks between Darra and Corinda stations. Work included a link to the Springfield line and upgrades to Oxley and Darra stations. In 2010, funding was allocated for the duplication of the rail line between Keperra to Ferny Grove.

Recent Extensions

The Airport rail line opened to passengers in May 2001. Under a BOOT scheme – build, own, operate and transfer – the Queensland Government licensed Airtrain Citylink to build the rail line, to own and operate it, and hand the entire infrastructure over to the Queensland Government after 35 years when the company will then cease to exist. Airtrain Citylink contracted Transfield Services to build, operate and maintain the line and finally Airtrain Citylink contracted Queensland Rail to provide rolling stock for the rail line.

In July 2007, Queensland Government announced the rail extension for the Gold Coast line. The first stage was completed in 2009 which took the line to Varsity Lakes. It was later proposed to take the line to Tallebudgera but it didn't happen.

A light rail line, G:link, on the Gold Coast opened in July 2014.

The Redcliffe Peninsula line between Petrie and Kippa-Ring opened on 3 October 2016.

Proposed railways
The Maroochydore railway line is proposed to branch off the North Coast line at Beerwah and operate via Caloundra to Maroochydore.

In 2011, the Queensland Government released a major transport plan Connecting SEQ 2031, which aimed to double public transport usage in South East Queensland. It proposed a number of service upgrades and rail extensions, including Cross River Rail, the Gold Coast light rail, a new high frequency Brisbane subway in the central city from Toowong to Bowen Hills, and a new North-west rail line branching from Cross River Rail at Alderley to Strathpine.

Cross River Rail 

In 2017, work began on a second rail river crossing for Brisbane as the Merivale Bridge nears capacity. The project includes just under six kilometres of new underground rail, three new underground stations at Boggo Road, Woolloongabba and Albert Street, new underground platforms at Roma Street station, and an upgrade to the existing Exhibition station. The new inner-city route will be used by the New Generation Rollingstock.

Operators

Passenger

Suburban and interurban passenger services are operated under the Citytrain brand of Queensland Rail, and are co-ordinated by TransLink. Long-distance passenger services operate from Roma Street around the state under the Traveltrain brand, while an interstate service to Sydney is operated by New South Wales operator NSW TrainLink using its XPT fleet.

In a city with a population of 2 million, passenger traffic on the suburban network doubled in the 10 years from 1979 to 1989 to reach 50 million journeys a year in 1989, and by 1992 it had increased by another 10%.

Freight

Aurizon operates the majority of freight services on both the  standard and  narrow gauges, with Pacific National on the standard gauge and their narrow gauge Pacific National Queensland division also operating services.

The main rail freight terminal is in the southern Brisbane suburb of Acacia Ridge, located off the Beenleigh suburban line at the northern end of the line from New South Wales. A freight line was opened from Acacia Ridge to Fishermans Island and the Port of Brisbane in 1980, running alongside the Beenleigh line from Salisbury to Dutton Park, then follows the Cleveland line to Lindum. Dual gauge access on the line was promised by the Federal Fraser Government in 1983, but it was not until 1997 that the work was carried out, eliminating the break-of-gauge and enabling trains to run direct from the port across the New South Wales border.

Approximately four million tonnes of freight is moved from outside South East Queensland to points within it; 1.1 million tonnes was to interstate destinations. One of the largest internal traffic flows is the movement of coal along the Western Line to the Swanbank Power Station and the Port of Brisbane.

The Fisherman Islands intermodal terminal was opened in 1994. Other rail freight terminals have been located at South Brisbane, Park Road, Yeerongpilly, Clapham, and Salisbury.

Further reading
 The Suburban Railways of Brisbane. Knowles, J. Australian Railway Historical Society Bulletin, February to September, 1964

References

Transport in Brisbane
Transport on the Gold Coast, Queensland
South East Queensland
Rail transport in Queensland